Jaalbandi is a 2022 Indian Bengali-language drama film directed by Pijush Saha. This film will be Pijush Saha's son Prince Prachurya's Tollywood debut film. The film is based on the novel Jaalbandi by Samaresh Majumdar. The film also features Payel Sarkar, Darshana Banik, Pampi Saha, June Malia, Dipankar De, and Kharaj Mukherjee. Gopi Bhagat is the director of photography and Amit-Ishan is in charge of music.

The film was released on 17 June 2022.. Jaalbandi is the highest rated Bengali film on IMDb

Plot

Cast

Soundtrack

Piya Jaago sung by Ishan Mitra was the most popular song of this film.  was written by Ritam Sen.

Reception 
Jeetu Lihar of Cine Talkers opined that "Director Pijush Saha’s storytelling skills have always been remarkable. Pijush Saha has to be truly applauded for coming out of the kind of commercial movies that have been going on for the last few years and for making such a great movie". A critic from APN News wrote that "Director Pijush Saha deserves accolades for believing in the new format of modern-day commercial storytelling". This film is the highest rated Bengali film on IMDb.

References

External links
 

Bengali-language Indian films
Indian drama films
Films based on Indian novels